van Beneden can refer to the following people:

Pierre-Joseph van Beneden (1809-1894) Belgian zoologist and paleontologist
Edouard Van Beneden (1846-1910) (Pierre-Joseph's son) Belgian embryologist, cytologist and marine biologist

Dutch-language surnames
Surnames of Dutch origin